Cape Race may refer to:

Cape Race, a point of land located at the southeastern tip of the Avalon Peninsula on the island of Newfoundland, Canada
Cape Race LORAN-C transmitter, an antenna tower at Cape Race, Newfoundland, Canada
Cape Race Lighthouse
The Cape Race, a five-piece rock band from Manchester, United Kingdom
MV Cape Race (T-AKR-9960), a US Navy ship